Araeosoma is a genus of deep-sea sea urchins in the family Echinothuriidae.

Description and characteristics 
Species in this genus are distinguished from other Echinothuriidae by their lack of ophicephalous pedicellariae (despite presence of dactylous ones), and the presence of prominent membranous gaps along horizontal sutures in interambulacral zones of both oral and aboral surfaces.

Taxonomy
The World Echinoidea Database recognises these species:
 Araeosoma alternatum Mortensen, 1934
 Araeosoma anatirostrum Anderson, 2013
 Araeosoma bakeri Anderson, 2013
 Araeosoma belli Mortensen, 1903
 Araeosoma bidentatum Anderson, 2013
 Araeosoma brunnichi Ravn, 1928 †
 Araeosoma coriaceum (Agassiz, 1879)
 Araeosoma eurypatum Agassiz& Clark, 1909
 Araeosoma fenestratum (Thomson, 1872)
 Araeosoma leppienae Anderson, 2013
 Araeosoma leptaleum Agassiz & Clark, 1909
 Araeosoma migratum Anderson, 2013
 Araeosoma mortenseni Ravn, 1928 †
 Araeosoma owstoni Mortensen, 1904
 Araeosoma parviungulatum Mortensen, 1934
 Araeosoma paucispinum H.L. Clark, 1925
 Araeosoma splendens Mortensen, 1934
 Araeosoma tertii Anderson, 2013
 Araeosoma tessellatum (Agassiz, 1879)
 Araeosoma thetidis (Clark, 1909)
 Araeosoma violaceum Mortensen, 1903

"†" means an extinct taxon.

References

 
Extant Pliocene first appearances
Taxa named by Ole Theodor Jensen Mortensen